Chamaedorea costaricana is a species of palm in the genus Chamaedorea, found in Central America. A common local name in Costa Rica is pacaya, though this is also used as a name for Chamaedorea tepejilote.

Description

They grow in colonies, with short horizontal stems under or at ground level, forming dense or open clumps, up to 6 m high and 2-6 cm in diameter, with internodes 5-30 cm long. Leaves 4-6, are erect-patent, pinnate 1-2 m long; with pinnae 20-26 on each side, slightly sigmoid or falcate, 25-40 cm long and 2.5-5 cm wide, long acuminate, 2 prominent nerves on each side of the main nerve, rachis 100-120 cm long; tubular sheath, 20-60 cm long, with an elongated triangular extension opposite the petiole insertion, forming auriculated lobes on each side of the petiole. The petiole is up to 35 cm long, abaxially with a pale band that extends to the sheath. Infrafoliar inflorescences, solitary, with peduncle 20-45 cm long, erect in flower, pendulum in fruit, bracts 5-8, rachis 10-20 cm long; inflorescences staminated with 15-30 splints, 20-30 cm long, flexuous and pendulous, green to yellow in flower, flowers 2.5-3.5 mm long and 2.5-3 mm wide, yellow-greenish, sepals free almost to the base, petals valved, free almost to the base; pistillate inflorescences with 10-20 slivers, 20-35 cm long, frequently only bifid, orange and bulging in fruit, flowers 3-3.5 mm long and 2-2.5 mm wide, in lax spirals, pale yellow, slightly sunken, sepals connate briefly at the base, petals imbricated almost to the apex, free. Fruits are globose to subglobose, 7-10 mm in diameter, green when unripe and turning black or black-purple when ripe.

Distribution and ecology
It is found throughout Mexico and Central America, in Guatemala, Honduras, Costa Rica, Nicaragua, Panama, and El Salvador.

It is a common species in humid or very humid forests, cloud forests, and dwarf forests, at an altitude of 600-1650 meters. It tolerates full sun, but is found to prefer shade in hot, inland climates.

Bibliography
 Correa A., M. D., C. Galdames & M. N. S. Stapf. 2004. Cat. Pl. Vasc. Panamá 1–599. Smithsonian Tropical Research Institute, Panama.
 Grayum, M. H. 2003. Arecaceae. In: Manual de Plantas de Costa Rica, B.E. Hammel, M.H. Grayum, C. Herrera & N. Zamora (eds.). Monogr. Syst. Bot. Missouri Bot. Gard. 92: 201–293.
 Henderson, A., G. Galeano & R. Bernal. 1995. Field Guide Palms Americas 1–352. Princeton University Press, Princeton, New Jersey.
 Hodel, D. R. 1992. Chamaedorea Palms 1–338. The International Palm Society, Lawrence.
 Hodel, D. R., J. J. C. Mont & R. Zuniga. 1995. Two new species of Chamaedorea from Honduras. Principes 39(4): 183–189.
 Stevens, W. D., C. U. U., A. Pool & O. M. Montiel. 2001. Flora de Nicaragua. Monogr. Syst. Bot. Missouri Bot. Gard. 85: i–xlii, 1–2666.

References

costaricana
Trees of Costa Rica
Flora of Costa Rica
Flora of Central America
Flora of Mexico
Plants described in 1859